Md Anwarul Haque (10 February 1948 – 12 August 2016) was an Indian politician who served as a Member of the Thirteenth Lok Sabha from Sheohar Lok Sabha constituency, representing the Rashtriya Janata Dal, later switching to Rashtriya Janata Dal (Democratic). He was Member of the Bihar Legislative Assembly from the Sonbarsa representing the Indian National Congress (I) in 1980.

He joined the Bharatiya Janata Party in 2004 and partook in the 2004 Parliamentary elections, but didn't manage to win. He left BJP in same year after the election.

References 

1948 births
2016 deaths